John Grant Alexander (July 16, 1893 – December 8, 1971) was a Representative to the U.S. Congress from Minnesota; born in Texas Valley, Cortland County, New York; attended the public schools; was graduated from the law department of Cornell University, Ithaca, New York, in 1916; was admitted to the New York bar the same year; moved to Redwood Falls, in 1916; was admitted to the Minnesota bar in 1917 and commenced practice in Lynd; engaged in the banking business 1917 – 1923; during World War I served as a private in the Three Hundred and Eighty-sixth Ambulance Company in 1918; engaged in the insurance business and in real estate management in Minneapolis, in 1924; member of the Minnesota National Guard 1927 – 1937; elected as a Republican to the 76th congress, (January 3, 1939 – January 3, 1941); unsuccessful candidate for renomination in 1940; unsuccessful candidate for governor in 1942; resumed the business of real estate management and insurance; resided in Minneapolis, where he died December 8, 1971; interment in Lakewood Cemetery.

External links
 
 

1893 births
1971 deaths
People from Cortland County, New York
American Lutherans
Cornell Law School alumni
Republican Party members of the United States House of Representatives from Minnesota
20th-century American politicians
20th-century Lutherans